November Blues is a young adult novel by Sharon M. Draper, first published in 2007. It's the second novel of the Jericho Trilogy, the sequel to The Battle of Jericho. The book tackles and discusses the issue of teen pregnancy, as well as making the readers aware that actions always have consequences and that taking responsibility for those actions is always very important.

Plot summary
November Nelson lost her boyfriend, Josh Prescott, when a pledge stunt went horribly wrong. After his death, November has to deal with the heartache of losing him forever. Also, November realizes that she is pregnant with Josh's child. November faces the pressures of telling her family and friends that she is pregnant at 16, being talked about and laughed at by her classmates at school, and figuring out how to provide for her child.

Awards
 2008 Coretta Scott King Honor Book
 2008 New York Public Library Best Books for the Teen Age
 2008 Young Adult Choice Books – International Reading Association

References

External links
 Author's website
 November Blues at Fantastic Fiction

2007 American novels
American young adult novels
African-American young adult novels
Novels about teenage pregnancy
Simon & Schuster books
Atheneum Books books
Novels by Sharon Draper
Literature by African-American women